The 2021–22 season was the 123rd season of the English Football League (EFL) and the sixth season under that name after it was renamed from The Football League in 2016. For the ninth season running, the league was sponsored by Sky Betting & Gaming and therefore known as the Sky Bet EFL.

The EFL is contested through three divisions: the Championship, League One and League Two. The winner and the runner up of the Championship are automatically promoted to the Premier League and they are joined by the winner of the Championship playoff. The bottom two teams in League Two are relegated to the National League.

The two-year partnership extension between the league and its official charity Mind expired after this season.

Promotion and relegation

From the Premier League
 Relegated to the Championship
 Fulham
 West Bromwich Albion
 Sheffield United

From the Championship
 Promoted to the Premier League
 Norwich City
 Watford
 Brentford
 Relegated to League One
 Wycombe Wanderers
 Rotherham United
 Sheffield Wednesday

From League One
 Promoted to the Championship
 Hull City
 Peterborough United
 Blackpool
 Relegated to League Two
 Rochdale
 Northampton Town
 Swindon Town
 Bristol Rovers

From League Two
 Promoted to League One
 Cheltenham Town
 Cambridge United
 Bolton Wanderers
 Morecambe
 Relegated to the National League
 Southend United
 Grimsby Town

From the National League
 Promoted to League Two
 Sutton United
 Hartlepool United

Championship

Table

Play-offs

Results

League One

Table

Play-offs

Results

League Two

Table

Play-offs

Results

Managerial changes

References

 
2021-22